Draco punctatus, the punctate flying dragon, is a species of agamid lizard. It is found in Indonesia and Malaysia.

References

Draco (genus)
Reptiles of Indonesia
Reptiles of Malaysia
Reptiles described in 1900
Taxa named by George Albert Boulenger